FK Omladinac Novi Banovci is a football club based in Vojvodina, Serbia.

History
The first football game in Novi Banovci was held on 1 September 1947, which is considered to be the club's foundation date. They spent six seasons in the fourth tier of Serbian football, before earning promotion to the Serbian League Vojvodina in 2015.

Honours
Novi Sad-Syrmia Zone League (Tier 4)
 2014–15

Seasons

Managerial history

References

External links
 Club page at Srbijasport

1947 establishments in Serbia
Association football clubs established in 1947
Football clubs in Vojvodina
Football clubs in Serbia